Lowe Army Heliport  is a military heliport serving Fort Rucker in Dale County, Alabama, United States. Owned by the United States Army, it is located 8 nautical miles (15 km) southwest of the city of Ozark. World's busiest heliport launching over 100 flights daily.

Facilities 
Lowe AHP has four asphalt paved runways designated 6L/24R, 6R/24L, 18L/36R and 18R/36L, each of which measures 2000 by 75 feet (610 x 23 m).

See also 

 Fort Rucker, located at 
 Cairns Army Airfield, located at 
 Hanchey Army Heliport, located at

References

External links 

 Fort Rucker, official site
 Aerial image as of 6 March 1997 from USGS The National Map
 Airfield photos for LOR from Civil Air Patrol
 

Airports in Dale County, Alabama
Military heliports in the United States
Military installations in Alabama
United States Army airfields